Soon is the twenty-first studio album by American country music artist Tanya Tucker. It was released on October 11, 1993 via Liberty Records. The top hits from Soon were the title song, "Soon" at #2, "Hangin' In" at #4. and "We Don't Have to Do This" at #11 on the Billboard Top Country Singles charts. "You Just Watch Me" rose to #20. The album rose to #18 on the Country Albums chart.

Track listing

Note: The liner notes of the Netherlands edition incorrectly state that track 4, "Black Water Bayou", had been previously released. It would later be included on the compilation album 20 Greatest Hits (2000), which would incorrectly label the track as "previously unreleased," even though it had been issued on this album seven years earlier.

Production
Produced by Jerry Crutchfield
Engineers: Joe Bogan, Warren Peterson, Ron Reynolds

Personnel
Tanya Tucker - vocals
Eddie Bayers, Paul Leim - drums
David Hungate, Michael Rhodes - bass guitar
Mike Lawler - synthesizer, keyboards
Matt Rollings - piano
Paul Davis - organ, backing vocals
Steve Gibson, Brent Mason, Brent Rowan, Billy Joe Walker Jr. - guitar
Rob Hajacos - fiddle
Jerry Douglas, Brent Rowan - dobro
Jim Horn, Harvey Thompson - saxophone
Charles Rose - trombone
George Tidwell - trumpet
Bruce Watkins - banjo
Gary Burr, Dale Daniel, Jonell Mosser, Curtis Young - backing vocals

Charts

Weekly charts

Year-end charts

References

1993 albums
Tanya Tucker albums
Albums produced by Jerry Crutchfield